Blame Everyone is the debut studio album released by British rock band Grand Theft Audio, which received generally positive reviews. It was released in October 2000 in the United Kingdom under London-Sire Records.

Singles
The album features two singles: "Stoopid Ass" and "We Luv U". Both of these songs have appeared in the UK Top 1000 charts and have been soundtracks for the movie Dude, Where's My Car?. The songs "Avarice", "Wake Up" (shown as "Wake Up In Your Own Mind"), "Dead Man Leaving" and "As Good As It Gets" appeared on the 2001 racing simulation video game Gran Turismo 3: A-Spec on PlayStation 2.

Track listing

References

2000 albums